Douglas Glover (born 14 November 1948 in Simcoe, Ontario. Canada) is a Canadian writer. He was raised on his family's tobacco farm just outside Waterford, Ontario. He has published five short story collections, four novels (including Elle which won the 2003 Governor-General's Award for Fiction), three books of essays, and The Enamoured Knight, a monograph on Don Quixote and novel form. His 1993 novel, The Life and Times of Captain N., was edited by Gordon Lish and released by Alfred A. Knopf. His most recent book is an essay collection, The Erotics of Restraint: Essays on Literary Form (Biblioasis, 2019).

He received a Bachelor of Arts degree in philosophy from York University in 1969 and an M.Litt. in philosophy at the University of Edinburgh in 1971. He taught philosophy at the University of New Brunswick in 1971–72 and then worked as a reporter and editor on newspapers in Saint John, New Brunswick; Peterborough, Ontario; Montreal, Quebec; and Saskatoon, Saskatchewan, until 1979. In 1982, he received a Master of Fine Arts from the University of Iowa's Iowa Writers' Workshop.

He has taught at Skidmore College, Colgate University, Vermont College of Fine Arts, and the University of Albany. He was the 2005 McGee Professor of Writing at Davidson College. He has been writer-in-residence at University of New Brunswick, Saint Thomas University, the University of Lethbridge and Utah State University. From October 1994 to October 1996, he was host of a weekly radio interview program called The Book Show at WAMC in Albany, NY. From 1994 to 2006, he edited the annual anthology Best Canadian Stories. From 2010 to 2013, he wrote regularly for the international affairs magazine Global Brief. In 2010, he founded the online literary magazine, Numéro Cinq, which he edited until it ceased publication in August, 2017.

He has two sons Jacob Glover and Jonah Glover.

Awards and recognition
 1984: finalist, Books in Canada First Novel Award for Precious
 1991: finalist, Governor General's Award for Fiction for A Guide to Animal Behaviour
 2003: winner, Governor General's Award for Fiction for Elle
 2004: Elle was the English to French translation finalist for the Governor General's Award for Translation
 2005: finalist, International Dublin Literary Award, for Elle
 2006: Writers' Trust of Canada Timothy Findley Award

Bibliography
 1981: The Mad River (Black Moss Press) 
 1983: Precious (Seal Books, reprinted by Goose Lane) 
 1985: Dog Attempts to Drown Man in Saskatoon (Talonbooks) 
 1988: The South Will Rise at Noon (Viking, reprinted by Goose Lane) 
 1991: A Guide to Animal Behaviour (Goose Lane) 
 1993: The Life and Times of Captain N. (Knopf, reprinted by Goose Lane) 
 1999: Notes Home from a Prodigal Son (Oberon) 
 2000: 16 Categories of Desire (Goose Lane) 
 2003: Elle (Goose Lane) 
 2003: Bad News of the Heart (Dalkey Archive) 
 2005: The Enamoured Knight (Dalkey Archive) 
 2012: Attack of the Copula Spiders (Biblioasis) 
 2013: Savage Love (Goose Lane) 
 2019: The Erotics of Restraint: Essays on Literary Form (Biblioasis)

References

Further reading
 The Art of Desire, The Fiction of Douglas Glover, Bruce Stone, Oberon Press, Ottawa, 2004.
  "'Amerique, terre des metamorphoses!' Relecture du mythe americain dans Le pas de l'ourse de Douglas Glover" by Nova Doyon, Quebec Studies, 53, Spring-Summer, 2012.
 "Bears, Bodies and Boundaries in Douglas Glover's Elle: A Novel" by Ruta Šlapkauskaite, Transnational Literature, Volume 4, Issue 1, November 2011.
 "Elle de Douglas Glover: Une satire ménippéene," Haijo Westra and Adam Westra, Littoral, Numéro 5, autumne 2010. English translation Numéro Cinq 23 Feb 2011.
 "Visited Graves in Colonial Cemeteries: The Resurrection of Marguerite de Roberval," María Jesús Hernáez Lerena, Canada Exposed/Le Canada a decouvert, Peter Lang Publishing, Berlin, New York, Brussels, Oxford, 2009.
 "A Canadian Bear, A Woman's Heart: Douglas Glover's Elle and Marian Engel's Bear," Christl Verduyn, TransCanadiana: Polish Journal of Canadian Studies, Vol. 1, 2008.
 "Self as Garbled Translation: Douglas Glover's Elle/Elle," Christl Verduyn, Traduire depuis les marges/Translating from the Margins, Denise Merkle, Jane Koustas, Glen Nichols and Sherry Simon, eds. Montreal: Edition Nota Bene, 2008.
 "Surviving the Metaphorical Condition in Elle : Douglas Glover's Impersonation of the First French Female in Canada," María Jesús Hernáez Lerena, Canon Disorders: Gendered Perspectives on Literature and Film in Canada and the United States, Darias Beautell, Eva, and María Jesús Hernáez Lerena, eds., Ed. Logroño: Universidad de La Rioja/Universidad de La Laguna, 2007
 "Structural Unity in Fiction," Sandra Novack, Descant 133, Vol. 37, No. 2, Summer 2006.
 "I am a Landscape of Desire: Gender, Genre and the Deconstruction of the Textuality of Empire in Douglas Glover's Elle," Pedro Carmona Rodríguez, Proceedings of the 29th AEDEAN Conference: Universidad de Jaén 15 al 20 diciembre 2005. CD-ROM. Ed. Alejandro Alcaraz Sintes et al. Jaén: AEDEAN / Servicio de Publicaciones U de Jaén, 2006. 539-45. Reprinted in Numéro Cinq 4 Mar 2011.
 "Romancing the 'Mysterious Bonds of Syntax': Allegory and the Ethics of Desire in Douglas Glover's 'My Romance' and 'Iglaf and Swan'," Adam Beardsworth, Studies in Canadian Literature, Volume 30.2, 2005.
 "Writing from the Sidelines: Peripheral Critique in Glover's 'State of the Nation'," Adam Beardsworth, Short Story New Series, Vol. 13, No. 1, Spring 2005.
 "'...[D]estined always to be on the edge of things': Prolegomenon to a Dialogue of Transdisciplinary and Curriculum Theory," Patrick Howard, Journal of Curriculum Theorizing, Vol. 20. Iss. 4 p.45, Winter 2004.
 "Douglas Glover," Bruce Stone, Review of Contemporary Fiction, Vol. XXIV, No. 1, Spring, 2004.
 "Becoming Masks: The Life and Times of Captain N. at n-1 Dimensions," Cheryl Cowdy, Henry Street, The Graduate Review of Literary Studies, Vol. 8:1, Spring 1999. Reprinted in Numéro Cinq 2 Nov 2011
 "Historical Fiction and Douglas Glover's The Life and Times of Captain N," Don Sparling, Brno Studies In English 23, 1997.

External links
 Douglas Glover
 Goose Lane: Douglas Glover
 Numéro Cinq

1948 births
Living people
Canadian expatriate writers in the United States
Canadian male novelists
People from Norfolk County, Ontario
York University alumni
Alumni of the University of Edinburgh
Governor General's Award-winning fiction writers
Vermont College of Fine Arts faculty
20th-century Canadian novelists
21st-century Canadian novelists
Writers from Ontario
Writers from New Brunswick
20th-century Canadian male writers
21st-century Canadian male writers